Aclees birmanus, is a species of weevil found in India and Sri Lanka.

Description
Adult beetle is about 12 to 15 mm. Lateral sides of the prothorax and elytra are covered with a white dust.

Biology
Larval stage is considered as a pest which bores through the wood. It's known to bore the wood of Ficus elastica previously damaged by the longicorn Batocera rubus. Other than that, it is also observed in Artocarpus integrifolius and Ficus religiosa.

References 

Curculionidae
Insects of Sri Lanka
Beetles described in 1895